The 2018 FIA Junior World Rally Championship was the seventeenth season of the Junior World Rally Championship, an auto racing championship recognised by the Fédération Internationale de l'Automobile, running in support of the World Rally Championship.

The Junior World Rally Championship was open to drivers under the age of 30—although no such restriction existed for co-drivers—and they were competing in identical one-litre Ford Fiesta R2s built and maintained by M-Sport. Crews who contested the Junior World Rally Championship were also eligible to score points in the World Rally Championship-3. The championship was competed over five selected WRC rounds with the winning crew awarded a new Ford Fiesta R5 car, tyre package, free fuel and a registration to compete in the 2019 World Rally Championship-2.

Calendar
The final 2018 Junior World Rally Championship calendar consisted of five events, taken from the 2018 World Rally Championship.

Calendar changes
The championship started in Sweden for the first time since 2006. The Rally of Poland was removed from the calendar after the event was taken off the World Championship schedule, while the Rallies of Deutschland and Rally Catalunya were also removed from the schedule and replaced by the Rally of Turkey. The changes were made to create a more compact championship with an earlier end date whilst giving drivers experience on a wider range of surface types.

Entries
The following crews competed in the championship.

Rule changes
The final round of the championship was worth double points to encourage crews to contest all five events of the championship.
Pirelli tyres replaced the DMACK tyres.

Results and standings

Season summary

Scoring system
Points are awarded to the top ten classified finishers. An additional point is given for every stage win. The best 4 classification results count towards the drivers’ and co-drivers’ totals, but stage points from all 5 rounds can be retained.

FIA Junior World Rally Championship for Drivers

FIA Junior World Rally Championship for Co-Drivers

FIA Junior World Rally Championship for Nations

References

External links
 Official website of the World Rally Championship

Junior World Rally Championship